The palmar metacarpal veins (or volar metacarpal veins) drain the metacarpal region of the palm, eventually draining into the deep veins of the arm.

References 

Veins of the upper limb